Peter Trokan is a Slovak professional ice hockey player in Slovakia with MHC Martin of the Slovak Extraliga.

References

External links

Living people
1980 births
Ducs de Dijon players
HK 91 Senica players
HK Dubnica players
HK Poprad players
HK Trnava players
MHC Martin players
MHK Dolný Kubín players
ŠHK 37 Piešťany players
Slovak ice hockey forwards
Slovak expatriate sportspeople in Spain
Expatriate ice hockey players in Spain
Slovak expatriate sportspeople in France
Expatriate ice hockey players in France
Slovak expatriate ice hockey people